People:
 Adolph Franz Friedrich Ludwig (Freiherr von) Knigge (1752–1796), a German writer
 Rolf Peter Knigge (1951–1990), a German pop singer/songwriter

Etiquette
 Adolph Freiherr Knigge's 1788 book On Human Relations is still often referred to as Knigge
 Derived from the above, any ruleset or book that concerns itself with etiquette

See also 
 32899 Knigge (1994 PY1), a main-belt asteroid discovered on 1994 by F. Borngen

German-language surnames
Low German surnames